Sodium/hydrogen exchanger 5 is a protein that in humans is encoded by the SLC9A5 gene.

See also
 Solute carrier family

References

Further reading

Solute carrier family